Bacopasides are triterpene saponins isolated from Bacopa monnieri.
 
Members of this class of compounds include:
 Bacopaside I, shows antidepressant-like effects in a mouse model
 Bacopaside II
 Bacopaside III
 Bacopaside IV
 Bacopaside V
 Bacopaside VI
 Bacopaside VII
 Bacopaside VIII
 Bacopaside IX
 Bacopaside X
 Bacopaside XI, shows nootropic activity in a mouse model

References 

Saponins
Triterpene glycosides